The Gabon women's national under-20 football team represents Gabon in international youth women's football competitions.

The team competed in the 2019 Sud Ladies Cup held in France.

See also 
 Gabon women's national football team

References 

under-20
African women's national under-20 association football teams